Diderik Kornelius Mortensen Bøgvad (4 March 1792 – 31 December 1857) was a Norwegian politician.

He was elected to the Norwegian Parliament in 1842, representing the rural constituency of Lister og Mandals Amt (today named Vest-Agder). He sat through only one term.

Residing at Øye in Kvinesdal, he had been a shipmaster. He died in 1857.

References

1792 births
1857 deaths
Members of the Storting
Vest-Agder politicians